Prof Samuel James Shand  (1882–1957) was a British mineralogist and petrologist, specialising in silicate analysis and igneous petrology.

Life
He was born in Edinburgh on 29 October 1882 the son of James Shand (1851–1929), originally from Sandsting in Shetland, and Catherine Grant Hunter from Lerwick in Shetland. In 1881 the family had moved from Shetland to Taap Hall, a curious Georgian tenement on Ferry Road in the Leith district. However they moved to "Selivoe" on Park Road in the Newhaven district and James was born there.

Shand received his secondary education at George Watson's College, Edinburgh, and then in 1905 received his BSc in science from University College, Dundee, which from 1897 to 1967 was part of the University of St Andrews. He then became a graduate student at the University of Münster and received a PhD (Promotion) there in 1906 with thesis advisor . Upon Shand's return to Scotland, he became an assistant curator in charge of the geological collections at the Royal Scottish Museum in Edinburgh from 1907 to 1911. He received a D.Sc. from the University of St Andrews in 1910.
Shand became in 1911 professor of geology and mineralogy at Victoria College, Stellenbosch (which was renamed Stellenbosch University in 1918). During WWI he served in the Royal Engineers as a lieutenant, helping to find water resources for the British army in the Middle East.

Shand established the geology department of Stellenbosch University and published approximately 30 papers on various aspects of the geology and mineralogy of southern Africa. In 1914 he presented fossils from the Bokkeveld Group and a collection of rocks to the McGregor Museum in Kimberley. Shand discovered, among rock specimens sent to him by P. H. S. de Wet in 1913, pseudotachylyte, which, in 1916, Shand was the first to scientifically describe.

Shand resigned in 1937 from Stellenbosch University to become a professor of petrology at Columbia University, remaining there until his retirement in 1950 when he returned to Scotland. In retirement he helped to reorganise some of the same museum collections in Edinburgh that he worked on forty years earlier.

He was elected a Fellow of the Royal Society of Edinburgh in 1952. His proposers were Sir Edward Battersby Bailey, Robert Campbell, Douglas Allan and Archibald Gordon MacGregor.

His parents had moved to Broughty Ferry near Dundee and recreated a family home there. He died at 1 Fintry Place in Broughty Ferry on 11 April 1957.

Family

In 1913 he married Anna Davidson (d.1947).

He was younger brother to Dr John  Glendinning Bryden Shand who moved to Glasgow.

Shand's definition of alkaline rock
The alkalies Na2O and K2O are present in varying amounts among alkaline rocks, and petrologists disagree on the precise definition of the term "alkaline rock".

Shand (1922)

Shand (1943) also defined a peralkalinity index.

Awards and honours
Shand was elected a fellow of the Royal Society of Edinburgh, the Mineralogical Society of Great Britain and Ireland, and the Geological Society of London, which awarded him in 1950 its Lyell Medal. He was for the year 1923 the president of the Geological Society of South Africa, which awarded him in 1937 its Draper Memorial Medal. The mineral shandite, a lead-nickel-sulfide occurring in the serpentine subgroup, was discovered and named in his honour by Paul Ramdohr in 1950.

Selected publications

Articles

Books
; rev. & enlarged 3rd ed. 1959
; rev. & enlarged 2nd ed. 1937

; 4th ed. 1951

References

1882 births
1957 deaths
People educated at George Watson's College
Alumni of the University of St Andrews
Alumni of the University of Dundee
University of Münster alumni
Academic staff of Stellenbosch University
Columbia University faculty
20th-century British geologists
British mineralogists
Fellows of the Royal Society of Edinburgh
Lyell Medal winners
Presidents of the Geological Society of South Africa